Who's Afraid of the Art of Noise? is the debut studio album by English avant-garde synth-pop group Art of Noise, released on 19 June 1984 by ZTT Records.

It features the UK hit singles "Close (to the Edit)" which reached No. 8 in the UK chart in November 1984 and the double A-sided "Moments in Love"/"Beat Box", which made it to No. 51 during April 1985 in the UK.

Critical reception

In a retrospective review, Charles Waring of Record Collector magazine gave the album four out of five stars and called it a "techno-pop classic". He said that it encapsulates both the popularity of the Fairlight CMI synthesizer and popular music in 1984—"the dawn of a new pop sensibility where sequencers, samplers and drum machines held sway". Slant Magazine's Sal Cinquemani also gave it four stars and said that it was "as subtly influential as Kraftwerk's Trans-Europe Express". He found its "blend of experimental rock and New Wave" both "brash" and innovative, and said that the album is "at times irksome but always groundbreaking." In his five-star review of the album, AllMusic's Ned Raggett called it an "entertaining and often frightening and screwed-up package", and said that "rarely has something aiming for modern pop status also sought to destroy and disturb so effectively." Ian Wade of The Quietus viewed it as an influential "brilliant racket of" what contemporary listeners of the album believe would be the sound of the future, and called its music "thrillingly inventive, reasonably danceable and full of interesting bits to laugh, love and dance to."

Pitchfork critic Tom Ewing gave the album's deluxe reissue a score of 8.6 out of 10 and said that it "flirts with annoyance and even boredom", but "could also be thrilling", and concluded in his review that it is "as sly, stirring, and occasionally infuriating now as it was on release." The Village Voice critic Robert Christgau said that, although its "concatenation of musical-instrument imitations and collapsing new sound effects" begets occasional interest and groove, only "Close (To the Edit)" sustains its performance.

Track listing

References

External links
 
 

Art of Noise albums
1984 debut albums
ZTT Records albums
Island Records albums
Avant-pop albums